Sectarianism in Lebanon refers to the formal and informal organization of Lebanese politics and society along religious lines. It has been formalized and legalized within state and non-state institutions and is inscribed in its constitution. Lebanon recognizes 18 different sects: 67.6% of the population is Muslim (31.9% Sunni, 31% Shia, small percentage of Alawites and Ismailis), 32.4% is Christian, the majority being Maronites Catholics and Greek Orthodox (with smaller groups including Greek Catholics, Armenian Orthodox, Armenian Catholics, Syriac Orthodox, Syriac Catholics, Assyrians, Chaldean Catholics, Copts, Protestants), while 4.52% is Druze. The foundations of sectarianism in Lebanon date back to the mid-19th century during Ottoman rule. It was subsequently reinforced with the creation of the Republic of Lebanon in 1920 and its 1926 constitution, and in the National Pact of 1943. In 1990, with the Taif Agreement, the constitution was revised but did not structurally change aspects relating to political sectarianism. The dynamic nature of sectarianism in Lebanon has prompted some historians and authors to refer to it as "the sectarian state par excellence" because it is a mixture of religious communities and their myriad sub-divisions, with a constitutional and political order to match.

Despite the religious nature of sectarian affiliations, sectarianism in Lebanon is commonly considered to be a political project, as it not only relies on, but also reproduces, complex and unstable relations between religious and sectarian affiliation, on the one hand, and politics, violence, conflict, and co-existence, on the other. Through the sectarian discourse, religion becomes the defining characteristic of the public and political subject, following a logic that has been established by (religious) authorities.

Sectarianism shapes Lebanese society on different levels. At the political level, distribution of key state figures and parliamentary seats is done on confessional basis. Also, parties are often organized along confessional lines. Partly due to the state's inability to provide the necessary services, parties and sects provide welfare services to the population, recreating sectarian divide at the societal level. The sectarian affiliation may also shape the access to economic opportunities depending on which group controls the area or sector. Finally, family law is determined by confessional community, with difficulties in entering an inter-faith marriage.

History

19th century 
Historians have argued that the origins of sectarianism lay at the "intersection of nineteenth-century European colonialism and Ottoman modernization." The traditional order of Lebanese society during Ottoman domination was not shaped along sectarian lines. Ottoman Lebanese society could be described as divided between an elite community that controlled religious and secular knowledge and common villagers that constituted the bulk of the society. Elite membership was thus determined by rank rather than religious affiliation, and relied on familial power constructed through a network of family alliances that often cut across religious lines. However, between 1840 and 1860, this social order began to be questioned and transformed, and religion entered the political sphere. The end of Ibrahim Pasha's occupation in 1840 created a power vacuum that various actors tried to exploit. Some of these actors relied on a religious base for their claims: the Maronite Church, for instance, called for the restoration of a Christian emirate in the region, while Maronite peasants asked for equality in the name of the Edict of Gulhane which in 1839 had guaranteed the rights of Ottoman citizens regardless of their religion. Moreover, the establishment of a new order in Mount Lebanon became the arena for the clash between European and Ottoman interests. While the Ottoman Empire attempted centralization through the Tanzimat reforms, European powers favoured local autonomies on religious bases. This European practice altered the meaning of religion in the multi-confessional society because it "emphasized sectarian identity as the only viable marker of political reform and the only authentic basis for political claims."

French mandate 

In the decades that followed, a colonial strategy and technique to assert control and perpetuate power used by the French during their mandate rule of Lebanon was divide and rule. The establishment of the Ja'fari court in 1926, facilitated by the French as a "quasi-colonial institution", provided Shi'a Muslims with sectarian rights through the institutionalization of Shi’a Islam, and hence gave rise to political Shi’ism. The "variation in the institutionalization of social welfare across different sectarian communities forged and exacerbated social disparities". Additionally, with the standardization, codification and bureaucratization of Shi’a Islam, a Shi’i collective identity began to form and the Shi’i community started to "practice" sectarianism. "The French colonial state contributed to rendering the Shi‘i community in Jabal ‘Amil and Beirut more visible, more empowered, but also more sectarian, in ways that it had never quite been before." This fundamental transformation led by the French created a new political reality that paved the way for the "mobilization" and "radicalization" of the Shi’a community during the Lebanese civil war. Subsequently, the formation of the modern Lebanese nation-state in 1920 and its official independence in 1943 were founded on politicized sectarianism as the only form of governance and presumed egalitarianism between individual citizens and recognized sectarian groups.” Hence, “in many ways sectarian identification converged with personal status, or madhhab, whereby the state recognized one official personal status per sect.” Regarding the Shi’i sect it has to be noted that this group was not officially recognized under the Ottoman Empire, while “the expansion of sectarian rights under the French mandate laid the foundation for Shi’i citizens in the postcolonial state, which entailed the formation of Ja’fari shari’a courts.” However, so far, the main emphasis of the majority of research has been on the top-down sectarianism, whereby policies and institutionalization have formed the main aspect of research. What is often forgotten is the bottom-up approach towards sectarianism. Scholars like Linda Sayed and Nadya Sbaiti have studied sectarianism from this often neglected approach and have come to the conclusion that citizens themselves have had a more flexible understanding of this segregation of groups in their society. For instance, Linda Sayed shows that Shi’i citizens used the court-system, created by the French rulers, in a rather pragmatic way than in a rigid sectarian sense and Nadya Sbaiti shows that people used the school-system in the same pragmatic fashion, creating communities of knowledge. In other words, people’s choices regarding the education of their children was rather based on guaranteeing at least a basic education “in the hope of some incremental if not dramatic betterment. Their decisions often centered around this goal and evinced less concern with the allegedly ‘unique’ confessional-communal characteristics reflected by a given school.”

National Pact (1943) 

Lebanon gained independence on 22 November 1943. Shortly thereafter, the National Pact was agreed upon and established the political foundations of modern Lebanon and laid the foundations of a sectarian power-sharing system (also known as confessionalism) based on the 1932 census. The 1932 census is the only official census conducted in Lebanon: with a total population of 1,046,164 persons, Maronites made up 33.57%, Sunnis made up 18.57% and Shiites made up 15.92% (with several other denominations making up the remainder). The National Pact served to reinforce the sectarian system that had begun under the French Mandate, by formalizing the confessional distribution of the highest public offices and top administrative ranks according to the proportional distribution of the dominant sects within the population.  Because the census showed a slight Christian dominance over Muslims, seats in the Chamber of Deputies (parliament) were distributed by a six-to-five ratio favoring Christians over Muslims. This ratio was to be applied to all highest-level public and administrative offices, such as ministers and directors. Furthermore, it was agreed that the President of the Republic would be a Maronite Christian; the Premier of the Council of Ministers would be a Sunni Muslim; the President of the National Assembly would be a Shiite Muslim; and the Deputy Speaker of Parliament a Greek Orthodox Christian. The referencing of Lebanon's census during every election year was supposed to determine the positions allotted to each religious sect, and yet this has not been done since 1932. Updating the census would result in an alteration of the power balance, thus changing the relative strength of ethnic communities - possibly in favour of Muslim communities, given the higher growth rate that has been observed within them.

Lebanese Civil War (1975-1990) 

During the three decades following independence from the French Mandate, the sectarian system established with the National Pact and developments in the region brought about escalating tensions that culminated with a civil strife that lasted from 1975 until 1990. During this conflict, sectarianism reached its peak: militia politics gripped Lebanon, representing another form of popular mobilization along sectarian lines against the elite-dominated Lebanese state. The beginning of the war dates to 13 April 1975, when a Maronite militia opened fire on a bus full of civilians in response to an assassination attempt of a Maronite leader, allegedly by PLO-affiliated Muslims.

In the years leading up to the civil war, Christians had already begun setting up armed militias against what they “saw as an attempt by the Palestine Liberation Organization (PLO) to seize Lebanon” due to the presence of the organization in the South of the country. These militias merged in 1976 under the umbrella of the Lebanese Forces, which became the armed group of the Lebanese Front's coalition - the Maronite alliance dominated by Kataeb Party (also known as Phalanges). In the first months of the conflict, the Lebanese Front main rival was the alliance between the Lebanese National Movement (LNM) - a coalition of nationalist and progressive Druze and Sunni movements - and the PLO. The PLO constituted the main military force of the LNM, but the alliance counted also smaller militias and, from January 1976, the Muslim splinter faction of the Lebanese army, the Lebanese Arab Army. In this first phase of the conflict, the Shiite front led by Imam Musa al-Sadr tried to maintain a neutral position, even though a military group, Amal, was formed. The rapid militarization of the fronts accompanied an escalation of violence that led in January 1976 to the massacres of Karantina (by Lebanese Forces) and Damour (by PLO and LNM forces). The first months of violence were accompanied by an intense political debate between the Lebanese Front and the LNM, especially in the context of the Committee for National Dialogue that tried to reinforce a first ceasefire during September and October 1975. The CND focused its debate around the possibility to reform the Lebanese political system from a sectarian to a secular one. Despite the Committee approving this reform, an alliance of Maronite leaders sabotaged it, blocking the way to any reform.

Syria entered the conflict in June 1976, in order to avoid a PLO takeover of Lebanon – Syria's entry into the war resulted in a de facto division of the country into zones controlled by Syria, the PLO, and Maronite militias. Initially Syrian intervention backed the Lebanese Front and was supported by Amal. At the same time, Israel opened its frontier with Southern Lebanon, co-opting dissident Christian units within Lebanese Army to put pressure in the southern regions. In March 1978 these units took control of the region, supported by Israel with the Operation Litani. Given the fact that the Shiite community was based in the South of the country, the Christian presence caused a reaction and reinforcement from Amal - with Syrian support. With Imam Musa al-Sadr's disappearance in August 1978, Amal moved further in supporting Lebanese Shiite cause, distancing itself from all fronts involved in the conflict.

The Lebanese Civil War officially became a regional dilemma when Israel invaded in 1982 with two avowed aims: destroy the PLO military infrastructure and secure its northern frontier through the establishment of a Christian Lebanon. Israel's invasion did indeed lead to PLO retreat from the country and the election of Bachir Gemayel, Maronite leader and commander of the Lebanese Forces, as President of Lebanon. On 14 September 1982, less than a month after his election, Gemayel was killed during an attack on his party headquarters. The death of their commander led to a retaliation against Palestinians by the Lebanese Forces, with a three-days long massacre in the camps of Sabra and Chatila in West Beirut. Amin Gemayel was elected president at the end of the month to replace his brother Bachir, thus bringing Kataeb party in control of the state. This situation, added to Israeli presence and conflicting approaches on how to resist it, brought to the fragmentation of Lebanon territory, divided in a multitude of "mini-states, run by militias who claimed to be defending their region/sect against the expansionism of the Phalangist state".

While Christians were in control of the state, Muslim militias landscape was more fragmented than ever. In the post-1983 context, the Sunni community experienced political marginalization due to PLO withdrawal, the disappearance of its major leaders, LNM dissolution, and political disappearance of Murabitun, its most important militia. The Shi'a community, on the other hand, was more active but more and more fragmented: the main contraposition was between a "legalist" faction that supported a political solution to the conflict, and a "radical" front that supported the continuation of the war. This latter front was mainly represented by the newborn Hezbollah, whose purpose was the establishment of an Islamic Republic in Lebanon and who soon remained the sole anti-Israeli resistance in the country after Israel withdraw in 1985. Amal kept an intermediate position between these two factions, but engaged in fighting Palestinian presence in the country during the so-called "War of the Camps", in tacit agreement with Israel. Finally, the Druze community under the leadership of Walid Jumblatt engaged in a revenge against 19th-century Maronite expansionism in order to restore the lost glory of Druze feudal status. The socio-sectarian model proposed by Jumblatt merged sectarian and class fractures, and found its main opposition in the Shiite Amal anti-feudalism. The result of this fragmentation was that between 1985 and 1990 each militia started taking control over parts of territory and population, initiating a sectarian and political cleansing within them. This also meant a growing "pressure on the individual to define him/herself in terms of a unique social and cultural sectarian identity".

In March 1989, Prime Minister (and Acting President) General Michel Aoun, with the backing of the PLO and Iraqi president Saddam Hussein, launched a “liberation war” against the Syrian army, which was still controlling part of the country. In doing so, General Aoun internationalized the Lebanese crisis by emphasizing “the destructive role of the Syrian army in the country”.  His decision resulted in multilateral negotiations as well as efforts to strengthen the role of the UN. By 1989, what had begun as an internal war between Lebanese factions had become a regional conflict that directly drew in Syria, Israel, Iran, Europe and the United States - with Iraq, Libya, Saudi Arabia, and the Soviet Union involved indirectly by providing financial support and weaponry to different militias.

After fifteen years of war, at least 71,328 were killed and 97,184 injured. Moreover, sectarian cleansing led to about 157,500 displaced Muslims and 670,000 Christians. To this it should be added the expulsion and displacement of Palestinians, perceived as "a people too many". Finally, the war led to the emigration of 894,717 people from Lebanon, with serious consequences for the country's economy.

Taif Agreement (1989) 

After twenty-two days of discussions and negotiations, the surviving members of the 1972 parliament reached an agreement to end the Civil War on 22 October 1989. The Taif Agreement reconfigured the political power-sharing formula that formed that basis of government in Lebanon under the National Pact of 1943. As noted by Eugene Rogan, "the terms of Lebanon's political re-construction, enshrined in the Taif [Agreement], preserved many of the elements of the confessional system set up in the National Pact but modified the structure to reflect the demographic realities of modern Lebanon."  As such, several key provisions of the National Pact were changed: it relocated most presidential powers in favor of Parliament and the Council of Ministers and, as such, the Maronite Christian President lost most of his executive powers and only retained symbolic roles; it redistributed important public offices, including those of Parliament, Council of Ministers, general directors, and grade-one posts, evenly between Muslims and Christians thereby upsetting the traditional ratio of six to five that favored Christians under the National Pact; it “recognized the chronic instability of confessionalism and called for devising a national strategy for its political demise. It required the formation of a national committee to examine ways to achieve deconfessionalization and the formation of a non-confessional Parliament," which has not yet been implemented to date and it required the disarmament of all Lebanese militias; however, Hezbollah was allowed to retain its militant wing as a  “resistance force” in recognition of its fight against Israel in the South.

Political system 

The Lebanese political system is republican, democratic, parliamentary, liberal and confessional. Its republican nature was established in 1926 with the creation of Lebanon, and is guaranteed within the Constitution. The Constitution also established its liberal, democratic, and representative nature. In regards to the latter, Lebanon adopted a unicameralist parliamentary system, but for a long time the power balance between the Chamber of Deputies and the President actually favoured the latter. Power balance was adjusted with Taif Agreement and the subsequent Constitutional Amendment of 1990. Unlike the aspects just mentioned, confessionalism is not established within the Constitution: in fact, the Constitutional Amendment of 1990 provided for the overcoming of confessionalism in several steps. However, these steps have never been taken and the only provision of the Amendment currently applied is section (3) of Article 95, which guarantees political rights to the confessions. The confessional nature of the Lebanese political system is translated into three main aspects:

 the key government positions are customarily assigned as follows: the president must be a Maronite Christian, the prime minister a Sunni Muslim, and the speaker of parliament a Shiite Muslim.
 the distribution of parliamentary seats is done on a confessional basis.
 grade one posts in public offices are distributed following a confessional representation logic.

As a consequence, "ruling political parties are defined more by religious affiliations than economic or social policy". This, however, does not prevent the forming of alliances, either formal or informal, across religious divides. Both the March 8 Alliance and the March 14 Alliance are coalitions that comprehend Christian and Muslim parties. March 8 includes Hezbollah (Shia Muslim) and the Free Patriotic Movement (Christian), while March 14 includes Future Movement (Sunni Muslim) and both the Lebanese Forces and the Kataeb party (Maronite Christian). The opposition between these two alliances lies mainly in their respectively pro-Syrian and anti-Syrian agenda.

Lebanese political system is dominated by elites, including "traditional leaders, military veterans, former militia leaders, and wealthy businessmen". A consequence of this is the apparently lack of opposition. As Freedom House reports, "consolidation of power among political elites also hampers intraparty competition" and government decisions are "the result of negotiation among the country’s dominant political figures, regardless of formal titles and positions; meanwhile, the legislature generally facilitates these policies rather than serving as an independent institutional check on the government".

Major sectarian parties by demographic

Christian

Muslim

Druze

Refugee question 

Given the delicate sectarian balance, the Lebanese state tends to avoid demographic alterations when this is possible. This attitude has consequences for what concerns immigration and refugees. According to UNHCR reports, Lebanon hosts the largest number of refugees compared to its national population (1 in 8 at the end of 2020, 1 in 5 if also the 480.000 Palestinians refugees registered with UNRWA are included). The three largest refugee populations are Syrians (840.929 UNHCR refugees in 2022), Palestinians (480.290 UNRWA refugees), and Iraqis (8.983 UNHCR refugees in 2022). Given that the demographic composition of these countries sees a wide majority of Muslims, both Sunni and Shia, and given the impact these numbers have on the Lebanese population, there is a tendency to avoid naturalizing the refugee population within the national one. Refusal of refugees' naturalization means that the refugee population is considered as foreigner, and thus has some restrictions concerning access to jobs, education and health services. For instance, foreign population need a work permit to be able to work, Lebanese must be preferred when hiring and some professions are barred to foreigners.

The case of Palestinians is emblematic in this sense. Palestinian refugees started immigrating in the country since 1948, but since then the great majority of them has never been able to acquire Lebanese citizenship. Officially this policy is determined by Lebanon's support for Palestinians' right of return, but indeed it followed sectarian rules. For instance, Christian Palestinians and those who had kinship ties with Christian families did get chances to be naturalized. Non-acceptance of Palestinians resettlement in Lebanon is also stated in Taif Agreement and was reiterated within the Oslo process. The non-naturalization policies are mainly supported by Christian and Shiite parties: "non-naturalised Palestinians being overwhelmingly Sunni Muslims, their settlement might add troops and a sizeable electoral base to the Sunni faction in Lebanon".

The Syrians also experienced the consequences of this no-naturalization policy, and continue to do so. Since the beginning of the Syrian war, Lebanon adopted a policy of non-recognition of the refugee status to Syrians, rather referring to them as "displaced" or "guests". Thus, the government refused to build any refugee camp, additionally informal camps by NGOs are considered illegal. According to observers, this attitude was guided by the fear that the emergency displacement would have turned into long-term stay, a fear that within the first few years of conflict came true. Long-term stay was an unwelcomed situation both for sectarian balance and the precarious situation of Lebanese economy in general, even though it also translated to a great flow of international humanitarian aids and funding. Despite the fundings, also granted by EU with 2016 Lebanese Compact, Lebanese policy since 2014 has been regulated by the so-called "October Policy". The policy aims at reducing the number of refugees, by closing Syrian borders and encouraging and later planning Syrians return, increasing security and "ease the burdens of local and national authorities". These policies were also guided by the spillovers from the Syrian war, in which Hezbollah soon got involved taking the side of the Syrian regime. In Lebanon this translated to scattered clashes and incidents and therefore to an increasing securitization, operated by different actors including the Lebanese Armed Forces and Hezbollah.

See also 

 Sectarianism
 Sectarian violence
 Religion in Lebanon
 Confessionalism

References 

Lebanon
Social history of Lebanon
Religion in Lebanon
Politics of Lebanon
Political terminology in Lebanon